Hill Street Blues is an American serial police drama that aired on NBC in primetime from 1981 to 1987 for a total of 146 episodes. The show chronicled the lives of the staff of a single police station located on the fictional Hill Street, in an unnamed large city, with "blues" being a slang term for police officers for their blue uniforms. The show received critical acclaim, and its production innovations influenced many subsequent dramatic television series produced in the United States and Canada. Its debut season was rewarded with eight Emmy Awards, a debut season record surpassed only by The West Wing.  The show received a total of 98 Emmy nominations during its run. The series ran for 146 episodes over seven seasons.

Series overview

Episodes

Season 1 (1981)

Season 2 (1981–82)

Season 3 (1982–83)

Season 4 (1983–84)

Season 5 (1984–85)

Season 6 (1985–86)

Season 7 (1986–87)

References

Sources
 Museum.tv showtimes
 Epguides.com episode guide

Lists of American crime drama television series episodes